Sawtooth City (also Sawtooth) is an abandoned mining camp in Blaine County, Idaho, United States.  Located at  (43.8965718, -114.8403490), it sits at an altitude of 7,342 feet (2,238 m), along Beaver Creek near its confluence with the Salmon River in the Sawtooth Valley of Sawtooth National Recreation Area.  Sawtooth City was founded after a mine was opened in the area on July 2, 1878; discoveries in the Sawtooth City area grew out of discoveries to the south.  Its peak was between the years 1880 and 1886.  A community cemetery is located northeast of the camp site.

In 1975, the entire community was added to the National Register of Historic Places as a historic district.

References

Populated places established in 1878
Unincorporated communities in Blaine County, Idaho
Historic districts on the National Register of Historic Places in Idaho
Unincorporated communities in Idaho
National Register of Historic Places in Blaine County, Idaho